The Huron Mountains are located in the Upper Peninsula of the U.S. state of Michigan, mostly in Marquette and Baraga counties, overlooking Lake Superior.

Geology

The mountains are the remnants of much higher peaks, composed of rocks dating back to the Precambrian period, which have gone through successive periods of uplift and erosion.  The outcroppings of granite and siliceous metamorphic rocks bear the evidence of more recent glacial action. Geologically, the area is part of the Canadian shield. 

Pleistocene glaciation deposited sandy loam or loamy sand glacial till on most of the terrain, and the soils, podzolized in well drained areas, are largely mapped as Munising or Keweenaw series. Loamy or silty mantles atop the till are mapped as Michigamme series, while sandy outwash often is classified as Kalkaska series.

The region is subject to heavy lake-effect snow from Lake Superior.

Ecology
The region is characterized by its boreal vegetation and unusually diverse and pristine habitats. It includes one of the largest remnants of substantially undisturbed old-growth forest in the upper Great Lakes region. Forests on the uplands are dominated by hemlock and northern hardwoods. Forests on the steep slopes and mountain ridges are dominated by pine-oak stands.

Fauna in the area includes wolves, moose, coyotes, cougar, fisher, marten, mink, white-tailed deer, gray and red foxes, porcupines, black bears, river otters and beavers.

Conservation

The area has been preserved largely due to the influence of the highly exclusive Huron Mountain Club (HMC), which owns a large tract of land in the mountains, including a portion of the Salmon Trout River. The club commissioned noted naturalist Aldo Leopold to create a preservation plan for the area.  However, the private club also restricts access to its property, which is unfortunate for white water rafting enthusiasts since the Salmon Trout is rumored to be one of the best rafting rivers in Michigan. The exclusive club even put Henry Ford on a waiting list. In order to gain favor with the club, Ford blocked the construction of a planned extension of highway M-35 through the mountains. After gaining membership, Ford commissioned noted architect Albert Kahn in 1929 to build a $100,000 cabin for his use.

The Huron Mountain Wildlife Foundation sponsors natural science research in the region, including the HMC lands.

In the late 1950s, the Huron Mountains were a candidate for becoming a national park. However, the HMC was influential in undermining the proposal.

References

External links
Huron Mountain Wildlife Foundation
M-35:  The Highway Henry Ford Stopped

Mountain ranges of Michigan
Huron Mountains
Protected areas of Baraga County, Michigan
Protected areas of Marquette County, Michigan
Nature reserves in Michigan
Landforms of Baraga County, Michigan
Landforms of Marquette County, Michigan